The Franz Zavadil Farmstead, also known as the Zavadil Farmstead, is a house and a group of farm buildings in Menominee, Nebraska, United States.  The property was obtained in 1876 by Franz Zavadil, an immigrant from Bohemia.  The farmstead includes  of land and 19 separate structures, including two dwellings, a garage, a granary, a privy, a blacksmith's shop, barns and sheds. It was listed on the National Register of Historic Places on January 31, 1985.

References

External links
 
 
 Farm history in the making

Buildings and structures in Cedar County, Nebraska
Czech-American culture in Nebraska
Farms on the National Register of Historic Places in Nebraska
National Register of Historic Places in Cedar County, Nebraska